Aghajari Airport  is an airport serving Omidiyeh, a city in and the capital of Central District, in Omidiyeh County, Khuzestan Province, Iran.

Facilities

Airlines and destinations

References

External links
 

Airports in Iran
Transportation in Khuzestan Province
Buildings and structures in Khuzestan Province